The Administrative Procedure Law of the People's Republic of China (APL) is legislation passed in 1990 that authorized private suits against administrative organs and personal on the grounds of infringement of their rights.  The law is often referred to in English as the Administrative Litigation Law which is a closer translation of the Chinese, but which is not the official English translation used by the PRC government.

Article 11 lists types of administrative actions that can be challenged must be "concrete actions" which include: administrative punishments (such as detentions and fines), administrative coercive measures, interference with the operations of enterprises, refusal to take action or perform an obligation, unlawful demands for performance of duties, and violations of rights of the person or a property right. The review of state action is carried out in the local people's courts. 

Article 12 limits the scope of the law.  Court review of agency action is not permitted for state action involving national defense or foreign affairs. Moreover, the court cannot review administrative legislation.

Despite these limitations, many observers have argued that the Administrative Litigation Law has greatly furthered the spread of rule of law within the People's Republic of China.  An estimated one fifth of the cases in which the law has been invoked have been decided against the government, and many legal experts have argued that the number of cases decided against the government is far higher because often the state will settle rather than losing in court.

A typical case involving the ALL involves misappropriation of land.  The PRC has a very complex system of land tenure and land use rights, and often local governments will move land from agriculture to construction illegally.

References

Chinese administrative law